Four-time defending champion Esther Vergeer defeated Marjolein Buis in the final, 6–0, 6–2 to win the women's singles wheelchair tennis title at the 2011 French Open. It was Buis' first major singles final.

Seeds
 Esther Vergeer (champion)
 Jiske Griffioen (semifinals)

Draw

Finals

References
Main Draw

Wheelchair Women's Singles
French Open, 2011 Women's Singles